Richard Andrés Leyton Abrigo (born January 25, 1987) is a Chilean footballer, who plays goalkeeper for Deportes Copiapó.

Club career
He made his professional debut in 2006 in a game versus Deportes Puerto Montt.

In 2010, he joined Santiago Morning.

International career
In the 2007 South American Youth Championship in Paraguay, Leyton started the first two games for Chile.  Chile lost those two games by a combined scored of 5–2.  Leyton was regulated to the bench and Cristopher Toselli took over in goal for the rest of the tournament and subsequently the 2007 FIFA U-20 World Cup in Canada.  Leyton did not make the trip to Canada.

Later, he represented Chile U23 at the 2008 Inter Continental Cup in Malaysia.

Honours

Club
Colo-Colo
 Primera División de Chile (4): 2006 Apertura, 2006 Clausura, 2007 Apertura, 2007 Clausura

References

External links
 BDFA profile

1987 births
Living people
People from Santiago
Chilean footballers
Chile under-20 international footballers
Chilean people of English descent
Colo-Colo footballers
Puerto Montt footballers
Santiago Morning footballers
Ñublense footballers
San Luis de Quillota footballers
Coquimbo Unido footballers
Curicó Unido footballers
Malleco Unido footballers
Deportes Valdivia footballers
Rangers de Talca footballers
Universidad de Concepción footballers
Deportes Copiapó footballers
Chilean Primera División players
Primera B de Chile players
Segunda División Profesional de Chile players
Footballers from Santiago
Association football goalkeepers